Ronnie, Ronald or Ron Burns may refer to:

Sports
 Ronald Burns (athlete) (1903–1985), Indian Olympic sprinter
 Ronnie Burns (footballer) (born 1973), former Australian rules footballer 
 Ronald Burns (swimmer) (born 1933), British Olympic swimmer

Others
 Ronnie Burns (actor) (1935–2007), part-time actor, adopted son of George Burns and Gracie Allen
 Ronnie Burns (singer) (born 1946 ), Australian pop singer

See also
 Ronnie Byrne, Australian rules footballer